Mokolo Dam (previously known as the Hans Strijdom Dam) is a rock-fill type dam located on the Mokolo River, near Lephalale, Limpopo, South Africa. It was established in 1980. The Malmanies River and the Bulspruit River, two tributaries of the Mokolo, also enter the dam from its left side. The dam supplies water to Lephalale town. The dam mainly serves for municipal and industrial purposes and its hazard potentials has been ranked high (3).

The dam supplies the  Lephalale area, Grootgeluk coal mine, Matimba power station and part of the water requirements of Medupi power station.

The Mokolo Dam Nature Reserve is located by the eastern and southern sides of the dam. The shoreline of the dam is heavily infested with Phragmites reeds.

See also
List of reservoirs and dams in South Africa
List of rivers of South Africa

References

External links
Mokolo Dam Nature Reserve, Limpopo
African Dams

Dams in South Africa
Dams completed in 1980